The 2012 Pomeroy Inn & Suites Prairie Showdown was held from March 8 to 11 at the Grande Prairie Curling Club in Grande Prairie, Alberta as part of the 2011–12 World Curling Tour. The event is being held in a triple knockout format. The purse for the event was a total of CAD$100,000, with the men's and women's events splitting the purse equally at CAD$50,000 apiece. The winner of each event received CAD$15,000.

Because the event planners missed the registration deadline for this season's World Curling Tour events, this year's bonspiel will not count for ranking points on the Order of Merit or the Canadian Team Ranking System.

Men

Teams

Round-robin standings

Playoffs

Women

Teams

Round-robin standings

Playoffs

References

External links

Pomeroy Inn and Suites Prairie Showdown
Sport in Grande Prairie